Self-Portrait with Monkey (Autorretrato con mono in Spanish) is an oil on masonite painting by Mexican artist Frida Kahlo, commissioned in 1938 by A. Conger Goodyear, then president of the Museum of Modern Art in New York City. It is one of the many self-portraits painted by Kahlo for friends and patrons during her career.

The original is housed at the Albright–Knox Art Gallery in Buffalo, New York. American singer-songwriter Madonna acquired this painting, and in 2001 she lent this piece at the Tate Modern exhibition Surrealism: Desire Unbound, which was the first British exhibition dedicated to Kahlo.

References

Paintings by Frida Kahlo
1938 paintings
Self-portraits
Paintings in the collection of the Albright–Knox Art Gallery
Monkeys in art